Gardner House is a historic home located near Jamestown, Guilford County, North Carolina. It was built in 1827, and is a two-story, four bay by two bay, brick dwelling. It has a one-story, four bay rear wing and features an unusual arch-linked double chimney.  The interior has a modified Quaker plan.  Also on the property is the site of the Gardner gold mine.

It was listed on the National Register of Historic Places in 1974.

References

Houses on the National Register of Historic Places in North Carolina
Houses completed in 1827
Houses in Guilford County, North Carolina
National Register of Historic Places in Guilford County, North Carolina
1827 establishments in North Carolina